Tru Dawgs is a compilation album by rapper C-Murder. It was released on April 30, 2002 through D3/Riviera Records and featured production from Donald XL Robertson and Carlos Stephens . Tru Dawgs peaked at #67 on the Billboard 200 and #15 on the Top R&B/Hip-Hop Albums and was the last album he made before he was jailed for murder. The album also featured a large amount of No Limit Records alumni including Master P, Silkk the Shocker, Mac, Snoop Dogg, Mia X and Soulja Slim.

Track listing
"Intro" (Skit) 1:37
"I'm a Baller" (Performed by C-Murder, Mac, T-Bo & XL) 3:54 
"Dogged Her Out" (Performed by Snoop Dogg) 3:33
"Ain't No Pimpin'" (Performed by Chan & Storm of Doggy's Angels) 4:08
"Water Whipped" (Performed by Soulja Slim & The Cut Throat Comitty) 5:28
"Where the Party At?" (Performed by Master P, Silkk the Shocker, Krazy & Bass Heavy) 3:20
"This or That" (Performed by C-Murder & Keala) 3:17
"Respect My Mind" (Performed by T-Bo & Malachi) 3:35
"Just Like That" (Performed by Keith Murray) 4:49
"They Wanna Pay for It" (Performed by Mia X) 3:50
"Tru Dawgs" (Performed by Wango) 3:22
"That Ain't Right" (Performed by Curren$y & XL) 4:04
"Soulja Down" (Performed by Tre-Nitty) 3:54
"What's the Reason?" (Performed by C-Murder & Keala) 3:16
"Front Line Hommies" (Performed by Bone Brothers) 4:47
"Got It on My Mind" (Performed by Junie Bezel) 3:20
"How a Thug Likes It Remix" (Performed by C-Murder, Da Brat & Jermaine Dupri) 3:26
"Betya"  (Performed by C-Murder) (Hidden Bonus Track)

Chart positions

References

2002 compilation albums
C-Murder albums
Gangsta rap compilation albums